Same-sex marriage has been legal in Michoacán since 23 June 2016. On 18 May 2016, the Congress of Michoacán approved a bill to legalise same-sex marriage by a vote of 27 in favour, none opposed and 8 abstentions. The law was published in the state's official journal on 22 June, and took effect the following day. Previously, Congress had refused to amend the Family Code to legalize same-sex marriage, despite a ruling by a state judge requiring it to do so.

Michoacán also offers domestic partnerships to same-sex and opposite-sex couples. Legislation to this effect passed Congress in September 2015.

Domestic partnerships
In November 2006, it was announced that several civil union bills would be formally introduced to the Congress of Michoacán. A bill was introduced in 2007, but it stalled and was not voted on. After same-sex marriage was approved in Mexico City in 2010, the Party of the Democratic Revolution (PRD) announced it would propose bills for same-sex marriage and adoption, along with a "law for coexistence partnerships" to legalize same-sex civil unions. A bill was submitted in March 2010 by the Grupo de Facto Diversidad Sexual en Michoacán, which proposed both marriage and cohabitation, but did not mention adoption rights. As with the previous proposals, it stalled.

On 27 August 2015, the Justice and Human Rights Committee approved a new text of the Family Code that maintained the heterosexual definition of marriage but enacted domestic partnerships for same-sex couples. It was approved unanimously by Congress in a 34–0 vote on 7 September 2015. The law was published on 30 September 2015 in the state's official journal. The following month, an action of unconstitutionality (accion de inconstitucionalidad; docketed 107/2015) was filed with the Mexican Supreme Court by the State Human Rights Commission. The Commission argued that providing only partnerships to same-sex couples and marriage to opposite-sex couples was discriminatory and violated Articles 1 and 4 of the Constitution of Mexico. The lawsuit was rendered moot as a result of the state's legalization of same-sex marriage in May 2016. The court voted unanimously to dismiss the challenge on 18 June 2018 for this reason.

Domestic partnerships were previously available to same-sex couples only. Since 23 June 2016, heterosexual couples may enter into domestic partnerships as well.

Same-sex marriage

Background

After 4 years of legal process, a federal court ruled on 5 March 2014 that the state had unfairly discriminated against a lesbian couple, Alejandra Banderas Rosales and Claudia Brizeiry López Ramos, by preventing them from marrying. The court ordered the local civil registrar to perform the marriage. The couple married in Morelia on 12 March 2014, making them the first same-sex couple to marry in Michoacán.

On 6 May 2014, it was announced that a second lesbian couple, Elizabeth Cervantes Guerrero and Cecilia González Villanueva, had obtained an amparo, and seven more cases were pending. The couple married on 16 May and subsequently on 15 August 2014 filed the registration of their twin children's birth, which had also been approved by an amparo. It was the first registration in the state of a child born to a same-sex couple. Gerardo Herrera Pérez, president of Grupo de Facto Diversidad Sexual en Michoacán, announced that they had collected 100 signatures for a collective amparo in September 2014 and the initiation of the first adoption in the state by a couple who had married in Mexico City.

It was announced on 20 June 2015 that a third lesbian couple had obtained an amparo to marry. On 29 June 2015, a spokesperson for the civil registry said they had formalized six same-sex unions in the previous year. On 10 July 2015, a judge from the Seventh District Court ordered the state to accommodate a lesbian couple's amparo. The ruling gave the Governor of Michoacán and the President of Congress until 15 July 2015 to make the arrangements and revise the laws regarding marriage, or face penalties. The attorney leading the amparo told the media that state leaders would be found liable for not repealing the discriminatory parts of the Family Code in accordance with the judge's order. It was announced on 13 July that Congress would abide by the judge's ruling. When questioned by the media on 14 July, Governor Salvador Jara Guerrero declared that the changes would be applied on 15 July and was quoted as saying "Of course!" to removing the heterosexual definition of marriage in the state's code. On 31 July 2015, it was announced that an additional 19 amparos to marry had been granted to same-sex couples in Michoacán. In making the announcement, deputies Talía Vázquez Alatorre and Cristina Portillo Ayala regretted that the Congress still had yet to act, but hoped that these further amparos would emphasize the need for passage of the reforms to the Family Code.

Legislative action
Previously, the Family Code prevented same-sex couples from marrying. Article 123 (now known as article 127) defined marriage as the "union of a man and a woman", and article 125 (now repealed) described marriage as an institution whose goal was "perpetuating the species". Numerous state and federal judges had declared these two articles unconstitutional and discriminatory, and granted individual same-sex couples the right to marry. The Supreme Court of Justice of the Nation ruled on 12 June 2015 that bans on same-sex marriage are unconstitutional nationwide under Article 4 of the Constitution of Mexico, which reads: "Man and woman are equal under the law. The law shall protect the organization and development of the family."

On 18 May 2016, the Congress of Michoacán approved a same-sex marriage bill by 27 votes to 0 with 8 abstentions. This had followed previous attempts to pass a domestic partnership law instead of a same-sex marriage law as required by a judicial ruling in July 2015. The law was published in the state's official journal on 22 June 2016, following Governor Silvano Aureoles Conejo's signature, and came into effect on 23 June. It ensures that married same-sex couples enjoy the same rights, benefits and responsibilities as married opposite-sex couples, including tax benefits, immigration rights, property rights, inheritance, adoption rights, etc.

Article 127 of the Family Code now reads:
 in Spanish: El matrimonio es la unión legítima de dos personas para realizar una comunidad de vida permanente, en la que se procuren respeto, igualdad y ayuda mutua.
 (Marriage is the legal union of two people who establish a permanent community of life, in which they seek respect, equality and mutual aid.)

Statistics
The following table shows the number of same-sex marriages performed in Michoacán since legalization in 2016 as reported by the National Institute of Statistics and Geography. Figures for 2020 are lower than previous years because of the restrictions in place due to the COVID-19 pandemic. The civil registry of Michoacán estimated that 598 same-sex marriages had been performed in Michoacán by the end of 2020.

86 same-sex marriages took place in the state between June 2016 and May 2017. Most of these marriages were performed in Morelia, the state's capital, followed by Uruapan, Zamora, Apatzingán, La Piedad, Lázaro Cárdenas, Pátzcuaro and Puruándiro. The civil registry began training its employees to realise that same-sex marriage is indeed legal in Michoacán as according to some reports several same-sex couples were turned away when applying for marriage licenses.

The first same-sex marriage for a Purépecha same-sex couple was performed in Ihuatzio on 12 February 2022. There was no vocal objection from the inhabitants of the community, and the couple said they "were proud of [their] people, because being in a small community and having large families, where we all know each other, there was not, thank God, a negative response".

Public opinion
A 2017 opinion poll conducted by Gabinete de Comunicación Estratégica found that 48% of Michoacán residents supported same-sex marriage, while 49% were opposed.

According to a 2018 survey by the National Institute of Statistics and Geography, 46% of the Michoacán public opposed same-sex marriage.

See also

 Same-sex marriage in Mexico
 LGBT rights in Mexico

Notes

References

External links
 Text of the Michoacán same-sex marriage law in Spanish

Michoacan
Michoacán
2016 in LGBT history